Carl Petter Daniel Dyrendahl Nyblin (30 June 1856, Drammen - 19 July 1923, Helsinki) was a Norwegian photographer who spent most of his life in Finland.

Biography
His father was the sculptor, Carl Petter Dyrendahl Nyblin (1818-1883). After studying at the photography studio of the Norwegian Mapping and Cadastre Authority in Christiania (Oslo), he spent some time as a photographer in Drammen. Two years later, he established his own studio. Later, he opened branches in Vyborg, Åbo, Björneborg and Vasa. In addition to portraits and landscapes, he created reproductions of paintings and photographed theatrical productions.

He also sold cameras and other photographic equipment and, after amateur photography became popular in the 1880s, he opened a store expressly for that purpose. In 1889, he was one of the founders of the Amateur Photography Club, where he was a teacher and lecturer. His interests extended to other aspects of the visual arts as well, including oil painting. In 1885, he fashioned a memorial to the  Finnish War, which was installed in  Nykarleby.

He became involved with the Finnish Photographers' Association in 1897, but always preferred working with enthusiastic amateurs. In 1903, he was the primary organizer of Finland's first ohotography exhibition, at the Ateneum of the Finnish National Gallery, which included professionals and amateurs. From 1901 to 1905, he edited the Association's magazine, Fotografiskt Allehanda. When it was discontinued, he issued his own  Nyblins magasin (Nyblinin tietolipas, in Finnish), from 1906 to 1910. In 1916, he suffered a severe brain haemorrhage, from which he never fully recovered.

Although he relinquished active management of the studio in 1904, when his wife Wera died, as of 2021 it was still owned and operated by the Nyblin family.

Selected photographs

Sources 
 Detailed biography @ the Biografiskt lexikon för Finland

External links 

  Daniel Nyblin – Artwork Glass Negative Archives collections by Hanna-Leena Paloposki @ Lähteillä
 A History of the Amateur Photography Club  @ the Club website

1856 births
1923 deaths
Norwegian photographers
Finnish photographers
Norwegian emigrants to Finland
Portrait photographers
People from Drammen